CityMall Commercial Centers, Inc. is a subsidiary of DoubleDragon Properties. It owns a chain of community shopping malls, with branches across the Philippines.

History
The CityMall brand was launched in late 2015, with CityMall Arnaldo, Roxas as its first mall.

In November 2016, Grand City Mall Mandalagan, Bacolod made its grand opening, making it the first Grand City Mall to open.

Branches

NOTE: CityMall has upcoming branches that are planned and/or under construction, which are expected to open by the late 2020's to the early and mid-2030's.

See also 
 Primark Town Center

External links

References

Retail companies of the Philippines
Companies based in Makati
Real estate companies established in 2013
Retail companies established in 2013
2013 establishments in the Philippines
Shopping center management firms
Philippine brands